Johann Erker (1781 – October 18, 1809) was an Austrian rebel leader against the French occupation of the region during the War of the Fifth Coalition in the 1809 Gottscheer Rebellion. Erker was a Gottscheer, who were ethnic Germans descended from 14th century Tyrolean and Carinthian settlers to the then uninhabited Gottschee region.

According to the parish death records, Erker was 28 years old when he died, and lived in Windischdorf #12.

It is unknown if he ever served in the Austrian military, however he was almost certainly in the local Landwehr battalions raised by the Austrian government in 1808. During the 1809 campaign, a Gottscheer Battalion was stationed on the Italian front and after Austria's military collapse they returned to their home region. When the French advanced into Carniola and towards Gottschee in July, 900 Gottscheer Landwehr soldiers assembled to resist the advance. They were quickly dispersed by the French columns, however it would be very likely that Johann Erker was one of those men. He may also have played a role in the riots of September 10 in the city square, where the French district commissioner resorted to calling in a battalion to disband the 600 rioters trapping him in the city.

On October 7, 1809, Gottscheer and some Slovene people in the border regions south of Gottschee attacked French troops who were in the villages collecting taxes. By the night of October 8, word of this had reached the northern Gottscheer villages such as Windischdorf and Erker assumed command of the local men. Under his command, they joined in the assault on Gottschee City the following morning and attacked the French garrison. Numbering no more than 100 men, the French troops (from Napoleon's Italian regiments) fell back to the castle in the town square and were besieged all morning in the castle. Finally, the Gottscheers broke through the gates, and massacred most of the garrison. Commissioner Gasparini was one of the killed, dragged out through the streets and butchered by the angry rebel mob. After this battle, and during it for that matter, Erker's actions are unknown.

From October 9 to October 14, the rebel Gottscheer forces drove French troops out of the Gottschee region and laid siege to the city of Neustadtl to the north. Erker may have led the troops in this siege, or he led the Gottscheer defenses against the French troops as they tried to force their way in at Schweinberg. In Neustadtl, the rebels were driven off thanks to the arrival of reinforcements under General Carlo Zucchi, the bravery and quick thinking of defending commander Captain Luigi Tarducci, and their own ineptitude. At Schweinberg, 100 French soldiers tried to dislodge an unknown number of rebels (though probably not much more than 100) from their formidable defenses. That battle ended after several hours of fighting with the French withdrawal after their commanding officer was cut down by Gottscheer fire.

On October 15, Johann Erker was inside the city of Gottschee when the French relief force of 1,000 led by General Zucchi approached from the southeast. After a brief exchange of gunfire, the French troops advanced towards the town as the defense collapsed. Rebels fled the city and its vicinity as Zucchi's troops entered. Some stayed, and surely there was sporadic fighting and prisoners were taken. Erker was arrested here, along with Bartholomäus Kusold, Matthias Stalzer, Georg Eisenzopf, Johann Jonke, and many other Gottscheer rebels. The five named men were indicated as rebel leaders. After three days of looting the city, Zucchi ordered the leaders executed.

On the morning of October 18, 1809, a nine-man firing squad was organized facing the side of the parish church dedicated to St. Bartholomew, and one by one the rebel leaders were led out to die. Their order of death is not known, but regardless of the order Johann Erker of Windischdorf was killed on that morning against the wall of the parish church.

1773 births
1809 deaths
People executed by the First French Empire